Tshencho Wangdi (born ) is a Bhutanese politician who is the current Deputy Speaker of the National Assembly of Bhutan, in office since November 2018. He has been a member of the National Assembly of Bhutan, since October 2018.

Early life and education

He graduated from the Webster University Thailand and received a degree of Master of Arts in International Relations. Before joining university, he received a degree of BA in Political  Science and Sociology from Royal Thimphu College.

Professional career 
Before joining politics, he worked as a general manager and managing director at tour companies.

Political career 
Tshencho Wangdi is a member Druk Nyamrup Tshogpa (DNT).

He ran for the seat of the National Council of Bhutan from Punakha constituency in the 2018 Bhutanese National Council election, but was unsuccessful. He came in second receiving 1,511 votes and losing the seat to Lhaki Dolma.

He was elected to the National Assembly of Bhutan as a candidate of DNT from Kabisa Talog constituency in the 2018 Bhutanese National Assembly election. He received 4,294 votes and defeated Kinley Wangchuk, a candidate of Druk Phuensum Tshogpa.

On 30 October 2018, he was nominated by DNT for the office of the Deputy Speaker of the National Assembly of Bhutan. On 31 October 2018, he was elected as the Deputy Speaker of the National Assembly of Bhutan. He received 31 votes against 16 votes of Karma Wangchuk.

References 

Bhutanese politicians
Bhutanese MNAs 2018–2023
1984 births
Living people
Druk Nyamrup Tshogpa politicians
People from Punakha District
Druk Nyamrup Tshogpa MNAs